Daqo New Energy Corp. is a Chinese company engaged in the manufacture of monocrystalline silicon (mono-Si) and polysilicon (poly-Si), primarily for use in solar photovoltaic systems.  The company operates a mono-Si and poly-Si manufacturing facility located in Shihezi, Xinjiang Province, China.  Daqo formerly manufactured silicon wafers at a facility in Chongqing, China (discontinued in 2018) and photovoltaic modules at a facility in Nanjing, China (discontinued in 2012).

The company is reportedly tied to the use of forced labor in Xinjiang.

Corporate Structure

Daqo New Energy Corp. was incorporated in the Cayman Islands as Mega Stand International Limited in November 2007, adopting a variable interest entity (VIE) structure. The company changed its corporate name to Daqo New Energy Corp. in August 2009. Daqo New Energy Corp. operates through a number of subsidiaries underneath the parent company, Daqo Cayman. These are:
 Chongqing Daqo, established January 2008, handled manufacturing activities at Daqo's Chongqing facility
 Xinjiang Daqo, established February 2011, handles manufacturing activities at Daqo's Xinjiang facility

Listings

Daqo New Energy Corp. was first listed on the New York Stock Exchange in October 2010, and Xinjiang Daqo was listed on China's New Third Board (China's OTC market) in 2016.

Operations

Monocrystalline and Polycrystalline Silicon Production

Daqo produces its mono-Si and poly-Si using a chemical vapor deposition process in closed-loop reactors.

From its inception through 2012, Daqo's silicon manufacturing was performed in its Chongqing facility.  The Chongqing facility ended its production of silicon in December 2012, while the Xinjiang facility began production of silicon in Q2 2013.  Some of the equipment from the Chongqing facility has been relocated from Chongqing to Xinjiang.

The Xinjiang facility has been expanded several times, increasing its annual silicon production capacity.  As of 2018, an expansion (Phase 3B) is currently underway, which will bring the facility's annual production capacity to 30,000 MT.

In Q1 2018, 60% of Daqo's production consisted of monocrystalline silicon and 40% consisted of polycrystalline silicon.  Expansions 3B, 4A, and 4B will produce exclusively monocrystalline silicon.

Silicon Wafer Production

Daqo's Chongqing facility began production of silicon wafers in 2011. In 2017, the company sold 98 million pieces, up from 82.8 million pieces in 2016. Daqo used silicon from its Xinjiang facility to create its wafers, an example of vertical integration.

Daqo discontinued its wafer manufacturing operations in September 2018 in response to "increasingly challenging market conditions."

Photovoltaic Module Production
Daqo formerly produced photovoltaic modules at a facility in Nanjing. Daqo sold this business in 2012.

U.S. sanctions

Daqo is allegedly tied to the use of forced labor in Xinjiang. In May 2021, Daqo shortlisted three auditors to assess its operations in an attempt to refute the allegations. In June 2021, the United States Department of Commerce placed a subsidiary of Daqo, Xinjiang Daqo New Energy Co., on the Bureau of Industry and Security's Entity List.

References

External links

Solar energy companies of China
Photovoltaics manufacturers
Manufacturing companies based in Chongqing
Manufacturing companies established in 2008
Renewable resource companies established in 2008
Chinese companies established in 2008
Companies listed on the New York Stock Exchange
Chinese brands